Georg Nückles (born May 14, 1948) is a retired West German sprinter who specialized in the 400 metres.

At the 1972 European Indoor Championships he won the gold medal in the 400 metres race. He also won a silver medal in the 4 x 360 metres relay, together with Peter Bernreuther, Rolf Krüsmann and Ulrich Reich.

In domestic competitions, Nückles represented the sports club Kehler FV. He became West German indoor champion in 1972 and 1973.

External links

References

1948 births
Living people
West German male sprinters
Athletes (track and field) at the 1972 Summer Olympics
Olympic athletes of West Germany